Richard Norwood (1590? – 1675) was an English mathematician, diver, and surveyor. He has been called "Bermuda’s outstanding genius of the seventeenth century".

Life
Born about 1590, he was in 1616 sent out by the Somers Isles Company to survey the islands of Bermuda (also known as the Somers Isles), then newly settled. He was later accused of collusion with the governor, and that, after assigning the shares to all the settlers, eight shares of the best land remained over, for the personal advantage of himself and the governor. His map was published in London in 1622.

In 1623, Norwood patented lands in Virginia, but it does not appear that he ever went there. He is said to have resided at that date in the Bermudas. He may have made several visits to the islands, but according to his own statements he was, for some years before 1630 and after, up to 1640, resident in London, near Tower Hill, as a teacher of mathematics. He is also credited with founding Bermuda's oldest school, Warwick Academy, in 1662. 

Between June 1633 and June 1635 he personally measured, partly by chain and partly by pacing, the distance between London and York, making corrections for all the windings of the way, as well as for the ascents and descents. He also, from observations of the sun's altitude, computed the difference of latitude of the two places, and so calculated the length of a degree of the meridian (arc measurement). His result was some 600 yards too great; but it was the nearest approximation that had then been made in England. 
Isaac Newton noted Norwood's work in his Principia Mathematica.

During the English Civil War he seems to have resided in Bermuda, where he had a government grant as schoolmaster. In 1662, he conducted a second survey there.

Norwood was in England in 1667, probably only on a visit. He died at Bermuda in October 1675, aged about eighty-five, and was buried there.

Works
His published works are:
 [[Trigonometrie, or the Doctrine of Triangles]], 1631. 
 The Seaman's Practice, 1637. Published London.
 Fortification, or Architecture Military, 1639.
 Truth gloriously appearing, 1645. 
 Considerations tending to remove the Present Differences, 1646. 
 Norwood's Epitomy, being the Application of the Doctrine of Triangles, 1667.

Family
In 1622 Norwood married, in London, Rachel, daughter of Francis Boughton of Sandwich, Kent. He had a son Matthew, who in 1672–4 commanded a ship carrying stores to Bermuda.

Notes and references

Attribution

Richard Norwood, The Journal of Richard Norwood, 1639-1640, Surveyor of Bermuda, 1945, ed. Wesley Frank Craven and Walter B. Hayward, Scholars' Facsimiles & Reprints, .

External links
Account of Norwood’s connections with Bermuda
Richard Norwood

1590s births
1675 deaths
17th-century English mathematicians
History of Bermuda